Chris Wilkes may refer to:
Christopher Wilkes, American judge
Kris Wilkes (born 1998), American basketball player

See also
Christopher Wilke, American composer, lutenist, guitarist, and teacher